Parham Old Hall also known as Moat Hall is a moated site and historic medieval mansion close to the village of Parham, Suffolk, England closely associated with the Barons Willoughby of Parham, it is a Grade II listed building on the National Heritage List for England and has the remains of a formal garden, the site is a Scheduled Monument with remains of a 15th and 16th century building on its central island. A gateway that featured heraldic shields of the Willoughbys was dismantled and shipped to America in 1926.  There is in the locality another unconnected building known as Parham New Hall.

Art

Parham Old Hall, Suffolk by C. Scott being an Oil on canvas of 39 x 54 cm is held in the public art collection of the Lanman Museum.

References

Country houses in Suffolk
Grade II listed buildings in Suffolk
Grade II listed houses
Suffolk Coastal